Clément Félix de Boissière (20 April 1875 – 2 January 1930) was a French fencer. He competed in the individual foil, sabre and épée events at the 1900 Summer Olympics.

References

External links
 

1875 births
1930 deaths
French male épée fencers
French male foil fencers
French male sabre fencers
Olympic fencers of France
Fencers at the 1900 Summer Olympics
People from Montauban
Sportspeople from Tarn-et-Garonne